Stratos Apostolakis (born 17 May 1964), nicknamed  The Turbo, is a Greek former professional footballer who played as a defender or a defensive midfielder.

Career
Apostolakis was no stranger to controversy as a player, his switch from Olympiacos to Panathinaikos in 1990 led to the cancellation of the Greek Super Cup as the authorities feared riots.

As a footballer he played his best years for Panathinaikos being one of the key players behind club's European runs in 1991–92 and 1995–96. He played with Panathinaikos through 1998.

During his playing career, Apostolakis was capped 96 times by the Greece national team scoring five goals. and was a member of the 1994 World Cup squad. His 96 caps stood as a Greek record until it was broken by Theodoros Zagorakis.

He also spent six months as a coach with Panathinaikos in 2001, before resigning from his position at the end of the year and eventually taking up the task of coaching the Olympic team for Athens 2004.

Personal life
Apostolakis is the father of Kostas, who plays as a professional footballer at Panathinaikos.

References

1964 births
Living people
Footballers from Agrinio
Greek footballers
Association football defenders
Association football midfielders
Greece international footballers
1994 FIFA World Cup players
Super League Greece players
Panetolikos F.C. players
Olympiacos F.C. players
Panathinaikos F.C. players
Greek football managers
Panathinaikos F.C. managers
Panathinaikos F.C. non-playing staff